The 2019 Vitality Blast is the 2019 season of the t20 Blast, a professional Twenty20 cricket league that was played in England and Wales. It was the second season in which the domestic T20 competition, run by the ECB, has been branded as the Vitality Blast due to a new sponsorship deal. The league consisted of the 18 first-class county teams divided into two divisions of nine teams each with fixtures played, slightly later than usual, between July and September. Finals Day took place at Edgbaston Cricket Ground in Birmingham on 21 September 2019. Worcestershire Rapids were the defending champions.

On 7 August 2019, in the match between the Leicestershire Foxes and the Birmingham Bears, Leicestershire's Colin Ackermann took seven wickets for eighteen runs. These were the best bowling figures in a Twenty20 cricket match.

Teams

Points tables

North Division

South Division 

The top four teams from each division will qualify for the knockout stage.

Fixtures

League stage
All times are in British Summer Time (UTC+01:00)

North Group

July

August

South Group

July

August

Knock-Out Stage

Quarter-finals

Finals Day

Semi-finals

Final

Statistics

North Group 

 Highest score by a team: Yorkshire Vikings − 255/2 (20 overs) vs. Leicestershire Foxes (23 July)
 Top score by an individual: Tom Kohler-Cadmore (Yorkshire Vikings) − 96* (54) vs Leicestershire Foxes (23 July)
 Best bowling figures by an individual: Colin Ackermann (Leicestershire Foxes) − 7/18 (4 overs) vs Birmingham Bears (7 August)

Most runs

Source: ESPNcricinfo

Most wickets 

Source: ESPNcricinfo

South Group 

 Highest score by a team: Middlesex − 227/4 (17 overs) vs Somerset (30 August)
 Top score by an individual: Cameron Delport (Essex Eagles) − 129 (49) vs Surrey (19 July)
 Best bowling figures by an individual: Steven Finn (Middlesex) − 5/16 (4 overs) vs Surrey (8 August)

Most runs

Source: ESPNcricinfo

Most wickets 

Source: ESPNcricinfo

References

External links
 Series home at ESPN Cricinfo

2019 in English cricket
T20 Blast